The Super Coupe National (French for the National Super Cup) is a match competition in Mali football, played between the Malien Première Division (Malian Premier Division) champions and the Malian Cup winners.  Sometimes, if a champion also has a cup title, the runner-up in the cup competition competes with the champion.

Nearly all of its matches were played in Bamako.

Finals

1Stade Malien withdrew, the only super cup competition in Mali where no match were held

External links
Mali - List of Cup Winners, RSSSF.com

Mali
SuperCup
1993 establishments in Mali